Sergio Alejandro Ortega Cantero (born 26 September 1988 in Itaugua) is a Paraguayan football midfielder, who plays in Chile for Santiago Morning.

Footnotes

1988 births
Living people
People from Itauguá
Paraguayan footballers
Paraguayan expatriate footballers
Club Sportivo San Lorenzo footballers
12 de Octubre Football Club players
Provincial Osorno footballers
Santiago Morning footballers
Expatriate footballers in Chile
Expatriate footballers in Peru
FBC Melgar footballers
Association football midfielders